Victor Hugo Santana Carvalho (born 24 March 1998), commonly known as Vitinho, is a Brazilian professional footballer who plays as an attacking midfielder for Juventude, on loan from Red Bull Bragantino.

Club career
Born in São Paulo, Vitinho joined Palmeiras' youth setup in 2011. On 28 April 2016 he was promoted to the first team, signing a contract until 2021.

Vitinho made his first team – and Série A – debut on 21 June 2016, coming on as a substitute for Cleiton Xavier in a 2–0 home win against América Mineiro. However, he appeared in only one more match for the side during the year, again from the bench.

On 10 July 2017, after still being rarely used, Vitinho was loaned to FC Barcelona for one year, being assigned to the reserves in Segunda División; the deal was made official the following day.

Honours
Palmeiras
Campeonato Brasileiro Série A: 2016, 2018

References

External links
FC Barcelona official profile

1998 births
Living people
Footballers from São Paulo
Brazilian footballers
Association football midfielders
Campeonato Brasileiro Série A players
Campeonato Brasileiro Série B players
Sociedade Esportiva Palmeiras players
Associação Desportiva São Caetano players
Red Bull Bragantino players
Segunda División players
FC Barcelona Atlètic players
Brazilian expatriate footballers
Brazilian expatriate sportspeople in Spain
Expatriate footballers in Spain